Quiet Valley Farm is a historic working farm that is operated as an open-air museum.  Open seasonally, costumed interpreters operate the farm and explain family life from the 1760s to 1913.

The farm is a national historic district located at Hamilton Township, Monroe County, Pennsylvania.  It includes nine contributing buildings located on a homestead purchased by Johan Peter Zepper (Topper) in 1765.  It remained in the Zepper family until 1958, and is now operated as a 19th-century living history farm known as the Quiet Valley Living Historical Farm.  Contributing buildings are the main house (c. 1765), springhouse (c. 1765), bank barn (1850), frame wash house, fruit drying house, smoke house, ice house, storage shed, and wagon shed.

It was added to the National Register of Historic Places in 1973.

References

External links
Quiet Valley Living Historical Farm - official website

Open-air museums in Pennsylvania
Farms on the National Register of Historic Places in Pennsylvania
Historic districts on the National Register of Historic Places in Pennsylvania
Houses in Monroe County, Pennsylvania
Museums in Monroe County, Pennsylvania
Farm museums in Pennsylvania
History of Monroe County, Pennsylvania
National Register of Historic Places in Monroe County, Pennsylvania